Mbungu Ekofa (born 24 November 1948) is a Congolese football forward who played for Zaire in the 1974 FIFA World Cup. He also played for SC Imana.

References

External links
FIFA profile

1948 births
Africa Cup of Nations-winning players
Democratic Republic of the Congo footballers
Democratic Republic of the Congo international footballers
Association football forwards
Daring Club Motema Pembe players
1974 FIFA World Cup players
1974 African Cup of Nations players
1976 African Cup of Nations players
Living people